Turkey has been participating at the European Athletics Championships since its 4th edition in 1950.

Medalists

Source:

Summary

See also 
 Turkey at the World Championships in Athletics

References 

 
Nations at the European Athletics Championships
Athletics in Turkey